B.B Ankara Spor is a men's handball club from Ankara, Turkey, that plays in the Süper Ligi.

Titles

Turkey Handball Cup :
 Winners (1) : 2013

European record

Team

Current squad
Squad for the 2016–17 season

Goalkeepers
 Izzet Dogan
 Gören Erol 
 Taner Günay 
 Abdullah Kilinc 

Wingers
RW
  Efe Kerem 
  Durmus Mutlu
LW
  Ibrahim Bircan
  Burak Dagci
Line players 
  Taha Berk Basakin
  Atila Zaman

Back players
LB
  Alican Göcmen 
CB 
  Pavlo Gnoyevyy
  Eldar Nasyrov 
  Mücahit Özalp 
  Oleksandr Pedan
RB
  Adnan Diri
  Cemal Kütahya

References

External links
Official website

Organizations with year of establishment missing
Ankara Büyükşehir Belediyesi Spor Kulübü
Organizations based in Ankara
Sports teams in Ankara